The 2014 African Men's Youth Handball Championship was the 6th edition of the tournament, organized by the African Handball Confederation, under the auspices of the International Handball Federation and held in Nairobi, Kenya from 15 to 21 March 2014.

Egypt was the champion and qualified to both the 2015 world championship and the 2014 Youth Olympics whereas the three remaining top teams qualified for the 2015 world championship.

Draw

Preliminary round
Nine teams were drawn into three groups of three, with the top team of each group plus the second best of all the groups qualifying for the semifinal, the remaining two second-placed teams playing for the 5-6 classification whereas the third-placed teams of each group played for the 7-9 classification matches.

All times are local (UTC+3).

Group A

Group B

Group C

Placement round 7–9

Bracket

7th–9th place

7th place game

Placement round 5–6

Final round

Bracket

Semi finals

Bronze medal game

Final

Final standings

Awards

See also
 2014 African Men's Handball Championship
 2014 African Men's Junior Handball Championship

References

2014 in African handball
African Men's Junior Handball Championship
International handball competitions hosted by Kenya
Youth